Constriction ring syndrome (CRS) is a congenital disorder with unknown cause. Because of the unknown cause there are many different, and sometimes incorrect names. It is a malformation due to intrauterine bands or rings that give deep grooves in, most commonly, distal extremities like fingers and toes. In rare cases the constriction ring can form around other parts of the fetus and cause amputation or even intrauterine death. The anatomy proximal to the site of constriction (or amputation) is developmentally normal.
CRS can be associated with other malformations with club foot being most common.
The precise configuration of the bands, lymphedema, and character of the amputations are not predictable and vary with each individual patient. Also more than one extremity is usually affected, and it is rare for only one ring to present as an isolated malformation with no other manifestation of this syndrome.

Signs and symptoms
The constriction of appendages by amniotic bands may result in:
 Constriction rings around the digits, arms, and legs
 Swelling of the extremities distal to the point of constriction (congenital lymphedema)
 Amputation of digits, arms, and legs (congenital amputation)

Cause
There are three different theories to the cause of the constriction ring syndrome.

The first is the intrinsic theory, which was proposed by Streeter in 1930, implicates an anomaly in germ plasm resulting in the defects. This theory is reinforced by the clinical presentation of the constriction rings with other internal visceral and systematic anomalies. Because of these other anomalies the names "Constriction Ring Syndrome", "Constriction Band Syndrome", and "Streeter Bands" are given to this defect/disease. This is sometimes attributed to vascular disruption shared between cleft palate and other forms of cleft defects occurring together with ABS; this co-occurrence suggests an "intrinsic" defect of the blood circulation.

The second theory postulates the involvement of an intrauterine disruption during pregnancy followed by a cascade of events involving amniotic rupture. When spontaneous rupture of the amnion occurs early in the second trimester, the separation of amnion from chorion produces many small, thin strands that can become entangled within digits and toes. Later, as the fetus grows but the bands do not, the bands become constricting. This constriction reduces blood circulation, hence causes congenital abnormalities. In some cases a complete "natural" amputation of a digit(s) or limb may occur before birth or the digit(s) or limbs may be necrotic (dead) and require surgical amputation following birth. The names "Amniotic Band Syndrome" (ABS), "Amniotic Disruption Complex", and "Amniochorionic Mesoblastic Fibrous Strings" are based on this theory.

The third theory postulates the involvement of intrauterine trauma. Intrauterine trauma could be something like amniocentesis, or something like a fetal surgery. An intrauterine trauma could result in hemorrhage leading to acrosyndactyly. One study also showed the presence of bands as confirmed by sonography after fetal surgery.

Because of these different theories, there are many names for this syndrome. For a long time people believed the second theory about the amniotic rupture and strands. In the research cases not every child had a real (amniotic) strand. It could be that there has to be another explanation for the development of these anomalies.

Diagnosis

The diagnosis of constriction ring syndrome can be confirmed with an ultrasonography. The clinical manifestations can be extremely variable. It could be a single or multiple manifestation. This can be confirmed at the end of the first trimester or at the beginning of the second trimester. But not every patient will be diagnosed at that moment, most will get this diagnosis at birth.

Individual strands are small and hard to see on ultrasound, so bands are detected indirectly because of the constrictions and swelling upon limbs or digits. Misdiagnosis is also common, so if there are any signs of amniotic bands, further detailed ultrasound tests should be done to assess the severity. 3D ultrasound and MRI can be used for more detailed and accurate diagnosis of bands and the resulting damage/danger to the fetus.

Decreased fetal movement could be a sign of a serious problem which may include ABS. It is rare but possible for the membrane to become wrapped around the placenta or the neck of the baby in the womb causing strangulation and death.

There is a strong relationship between ABS and clubfoot (also called "talipes"). 31.5% of clubfoot cases can be correlated with ABS, with 20% occurring bilaterally. Other abnormalities found with ABS include: clubhands, cleft lip, and/or cleft palate, and hemangioma.

Differential diagnosis
The differential diagnosis includes:
 Symbrachydactyly
 Congenital amputations
 Hypoplasias of hand, digit, thumb
 Adams–Oliver syndrome
 ADAM complex

ADAM Complex; CRS is sometimes mislabeled as ADAM complex. ADAM is an abbreviation for Amniotic Deformity, Adhesions Mutilations. CRS is the malformation due to a constriction ring around mostly a limb. ADAM-complex is the association of limb defects (caused by constriction rings) and certain craniofacial clefts

"Adams–Oliver syndrome is often mislabeled as CRS and consists of cutis aplasia of the scalp in which a longitudinal defect can vary in size and can often be associated with full-thickness skullcap loss. The distal digital or toe hypoplasia-aplasia is often confused with CRS. Constriction rings with or without edema are not present. The digital or toe hypoplasia-aplasia usually contains diminutive nails or nail folds".

Classification
The constriction ring syndrome is a complex collection of asymmetric congenital anomalies, in which no two cases are exactly alike. This is why a classification is difficult to make.

The most widely used classification system was proposed by Patterson. This classification system is based on the severity of the syndrome and is useful because, the different types require different treatments. Other clinicians have amended this scheme by separating the depth of the ring into mild, moderate, severe, and amputation and by further defining the presence or absence of lymphedema or soft tissue loss distal to the ring. Expanding over subdivision in depth of the clefts for every classification is not necessary because the principles of treatment and technique for correction are the same.

There are four categories:
 simple constriction rings
 constriction rings associated with deformity of the distal part with or without lymphedema
 constriction rings associated with acrosyndactyly
 uterine amputation

Patterson divided the constriction ring associated with acrosyndactyly into three types:
 Type I: conjoined fingertips with well-formed webs of the proper depth
 Type II: the tips of the digits are joined, but web formation is not complete
 Type III: joined tips, sinus tracts between digits and absent webs

Patterson I
There are simple constriction rings which are strands most commonly around the distal extremities as fingers and toes. In general, the thumb is not likely to be affected by a constriction ring because the fetus typically holds the thumb in tight adduction flexion, making entanglement with strands less likely. These malformations need to be surgically removed which must be executed in different stages and can done by different techniques (see also treatment).

Patterson II
The CRS involves strands which obstruct the lymphatic vessels and thus causing fluid retention, distal of the affected extremity. This utters itself with swollen parts distal of the constriction.

Patterson III
In this form there is a complex form of syndactyly named acrosyndactyly, the fingers (or toes) were initially separated but due to the constriction they are formed back together. Sometimes multiple fingers can be involved. The distal fusion between digits or toes never initially involves a skeletal coalition. The digits are usually hypoplastic if multiple digits are involved. When the constriction cuts off the blood supply to the fingers, the fingers can form a peak with the most palmar digit being the index finger. Normal neurovascular bundles are not present in the distal parts. Hands with fused fingers need to be released in phases to preserve the distal blood supply.

Paterson IV
One of the most severe consequence of constriction strains is probably intrauterine amputations, this is where the constriction goes as deep as the bone and cuts off the blood supply of the proximal extremity. The result will be that the developing toe or finger will become ischemic and fall off. Because the result is a transverse amputation that cuts off the vascular supply to the developing extremity, the actual constriction ring is not seen.
This can result in different outcomes:
 complete resorption; this is the most common form of amputation. In this form the amputated digit is completely resorbed during intrauterine development and therefore the amputated digit can't be found.
 recovery of the digit; the digit is recovered with the placenta during delivery.
 engraftment elsewhere; the amputated digit can be, in rare cases, engrafted somewhere on the fetus.

Intrauterine death
In extremely rare cases a strain can form around the umbilical cord and cut off the blood supply to the fetus which will result in intrauterine death.

Malformation associated with constriction ring syndrome
The percentage of associated anomalies varies from 40% to as high as 80%
Constriction ring deformities are as common on the lower extremity as on the upper, almost all of these involve the musculoskeletal system, with clubbed feet being the most common in up to 30% of reported cases.
Large reported series reveal an incidence between 5% and 15% of craniofacial malformations with clefting of the lip or palate.

Prevention
Amniotic band syndrome is considered an accidental event and it does not appear to be genetic or hereditary, so the likelihood of it occurring in another pregnancy is remote. The cause of amnion tearing is unknown and as such there are no known preventative measures.

Treatment
Surgical correction is recommended when a constriction ring results in a limb contour deformity, with or without lymphedema.

Surgical technique
At the beginning of the surgery a tourniquet will be applied to the limb. A tourniquet compresses and controls local arterial and venous circulation for about 2 hours. The constriction band must be dissected very carefully to avoid damaging the underlying neurovasculature. When the constriction band is excised, there will be a direct closure. This allows the fatty tissue to naturally reposition itself under the skin.

"With complete circumferential constriction bands, it is recommended that a two-stage correction approach be used. At the first operation, one-half of the circumference is excised and the other one-half can be excised after three to six months. This will avoid any problems to the distal circulation in the limb, which may already be compromised. Lymphedema, when present, will significantly improve within a few weeks of the first surgery."

For the direct closure of the defect after dissecting a constriction band there are two techniques:
 Triangular flaps; For this technique the circumference between the two borders must be measured. Depending on the difference the number of triangular flaps can be decided. With a triangular flap you can create more skin.
 Z-plasty or W-plasty; "Z-plasty is a plastic surgery technique that is used to improve the functional and cosmetic appearance of scars. It can elongate a contracted scar or rotate the scar tension line. The middle line of the Z-shaped incision (the central element) is made along the line of greatest tension or contraction, and triangular flaps are raised on opposite sides of the two ends and then transposed."

In rare cases, if diagnosed in utero, fetal surgery may be considered to save a limb that is in danger of amputation or other deformity. This operation has been successfully performed on fetuses as young as 22 weeks. The Melbourne's Monash Medical Centre in Australia, as well as multiple facilities in the United States of America, have performed successful amniotic band release surgery.

Reconstructions and prosthetics
Treatment usually occurs after birth and where plastic and reconstructive surgery is considered to treat the resulting deformity. Plastic surgery ranges from simple to complex depending on the extent of the deformity. Physical and occupational therapy may be needed long term.

Prosthetics may help some people with ABS to live more functional lives. The price and complexity of these prosthetics vary dramatically, but advances in 3-D printing have helped to increase the availability of artificial fingers while reducing their cost of production.

Prognosis

The prognosis depends on the location and severity of the constricting bands. Every case is different and multiple bands may be entangled around the fetus.

Bands which wrap around fingers and toes can result in syndactyly or amputations of the digits. In other instances, bands can wrap around limbs causing restriction of movement resulting in clubbed feet. In more severe cases, the bands can constrict the limb causing decreased blood supply and amputation. Amniotic bands can also sometimes attach to the face or neck causing deformities such as cleft lip and palate. If the bands become wrapped around the head or umbilical cord it can be life-threatening for the fetus.

The number of cases of miscarriage that can be attributed to ABS is unknown, although it has been reported that it may be the cause of 178 in 10,000 miscarriages. Up to 50% of cases have other congenital anomalies including cleft lip, cleft palate, and clubfoot deformity. Hand and finger anomalies occur in up to 80%.

Epidemiology
The reported incidence of constriction ring syndrome varies from 1/1200 and 1/15000 live births. The prevalence is equal in male and female.

Fetomaternal factors like prematurity, maternal illness, low birth weight, and maternal drug exposure are predisposing factors for the constriction ring syndrome.

No positive relationship between CRS and genetic inheritance has been reported.

Society
Notable people living with ABS include:
 Sophie Wells, British member Paralympics dressage team
 Gina Casillas, US volleyball player
 Ian T. Jamison, US artist
 Anna Johannes, US Paralympic swimmer
 Jean-Jacques Machado, 7th degree red-and-black belt in Brazilian Jiu-Jitsu
 Monica Price, a case study of a young woman born with amniotic band syndrome
 Kingsley McGowan, U.S. Men's Rugby Player
 Troy Fumagalli, University of Wisconsin Football Player (2017 Cotton Bowl Offensive MVP)
 Lyric Mariah Heard U.S. model
 Shaquem Griffin, Miami Dolphins Football Player (2016 AAC Defensive Player of the Year)
 Jennifer Bricker, acrobat and aerialist
 Sarah Herron, The Bachelor Season 17 contestant, Bachelor in Paradise Seasons 1 and 3 contestant, founder of "She Lift" for girls with disabilities.
 Victoria Canal, Cuban-American singer and songwriter

See also 
 List of skin conditions
 Ainhum, auto-amputation of the fifth toe in adults

References

Further reading

External links 

Congenital amputations
Congenital disorders
Cutaneous congenital anomalies
Genetic disorders with OMIM but no gene
Pathology of pregnancy, childbirth and the puerperium
Syndromes with cleft lip and/or palate
Syndromes with dysmelia
Types of amputations